A private hospital in lashkargah, Helmand, Afghanistan. Currently managed by famous Afghan Doctor Abdul Baqi Samadi. Samadi Hospital is currently recognised as the best private hospital in Lashkargah also approved by the ministry of public health.

Hospitals in Afghanistan